Laspra is one of the eight parishes in Castrillón, a municipality within the province and autonomous community of Asturias, in northern Spain.

The main town of the parish is Piedras Blancas, the capital of the municipality.

References

Parishes in Castrillón